Gabriel François Joseph van Verhulst  ( ? – 1779) was a Brussels art collector whose collection was sold in Brussels in 1779.

Among the paintings sold were:

References

1779 deaths
18th-century art collectors